Tonk–Sawai Madhopur Lok Sabha constituency is one of the 25 Lok Sabha (parliamentary) constituencies in Rajasthan state in western India. This constituency came into existence in 2008 as a part of the implementation of delimitation of parliamentary constituencies.

Assembly segments
Presently, Tonk–Sawai Madhopur Lok Sabha comprises eight Vidhan Sabha (legislative assembly) segments. These are:

Deoli-Uniara assembly segment also came into existence in 2008 as a part of the implementation of delimitation of legislative assembly constituencies. Gangapur City, Bamanwas, Sawai Madhopur and Khandar assembly segments were earlier in erstwhile Sawai Madhopur constituency. Malpura, Niwai and Tonk assembly segments were in erstwhile Tonk constituency.

Members of Parliament

Election results

2019

2014

2009

See also
 Tonk (Lok Sabha constituency)
 Sawai Madhopur (Lok Sabha constituency)
 Tonk district
 Sawai Madhopur district
 List of Constituencies of the Lok Sabha

Notes

Lok Sabha constituencies in Rajasthan
Tonk district
Sawai Madhopur district
Constituencies established in 2008
Sawai Madhopur